The Center for Anatomy of the Charité is one of the centers of the Universitätsmedizin Berlin Charité in Berlin whose primary goals are anatomy teaching and research.

It is part of  Charité Center 2 for basic medicine and is composed of 3 institutes - Institute of Integrative Anatomy, Institute of Cell Biology and Neurobiology, Institute of Vegetative Anatomy. It has a long history.

History 
Past directors: Christian Max Spener (1713–1714), Heinrich Henrici (1714–1723), August Buddeus (1696–1753), Johann Friedrich Meckel, the Elder (1753–1773), Johann Gottlieb Walter (1773–1810), Karl Bogislaus Reichert (until 1883), Heinrich Wilhelm Waldeyer, Rudolph Fick (1917–1952), Hermann Stieve (1946–1949), Friedrich Wilhelm Kopsch (1946–1949), Anton Johannes Waldeyer (1954–1966).

Friedrich Schlemm (1795–1858) was full professor of anatomy in the University of Berlin since 1833.

External links 
 https://web.archive.org/web/20081211134425/http://www.charite.de/anatomie/

Bibliography
Andreas Winkelmann, 2008, Schlemm, the body snatcher?, Ann. Anat., 190, 3, 223–229, doi = 10.1016/j.aanat.2007.12.002
Andreas Winkelmann, Wilhelm von Waldeyer-Hartz (1836–1921): an anatomist who left his mark, 2007, Clinical anatomy, doi=10.1002/ca.20400, 20, 231–234.

Human anatomy
Charité